Edward Maynard (April 26, 1813 – May 4, 1891) was an American firearms inventor, most famous for his breechloading rifle design.

History
Edward Maynard was born in Madison, New York, on April 26, 1813.  In 1831 he entered the United States Military Academy at West Point but resigned after only a semester due to ill health and became a dentist in 1835.

Maynard continued to practice dentistry for the rest of his life, becoming one of the most prominent dentists in the United States. Practicing in Baltimore and Washington, D.C., his clientele included the country's political elite, including Congressmen and Presidents, and it is reported that he was offered but declined the position of Imperial Dentist to Tsar Nicholas I.  In 1857 he became professor of theory and practice in Baltimore College of Dental Surgery.

Maynard had two wives; his first was Sophia Ellen Doty (born 1826, and to which all of his known children were born) and Nellie Long (born 1845). Maynard's son, George Willoughby Maynard, was born in Washington, D. C. on March 5, 1843, and became a successful artist. His other children included John (born 1855), Ellen (born 1858), Josephine (born 1860), Marie (born 1852), Virginia (born 1854), and Edna (born 1870).

In 1845 Maynard patented the first of 23 firearms-related patents he was awarded during his life.

In 1888 he held the chair of Dental Theory and Practice at the National university in Washington.  He died in Washington on May 4, 1891, and was buried in the Congressional Cemetery.

Firearms inventions

Maynard invented many dental methods and instruments, but is most famous for his firearms inventions. He achieved lucrative fame for his first patent, an 1845 priming system which cycled a small mercury fulminate charge to the nipple of a percussion cap firearm. His   system used a magazine from which a paper roll, not unlike modern cap guns, advanced a charge over the nipple as the gun was cocked; this was intended to  accelerate the gun's rate of fire as the shooter could concentrate on loading and firing the gun. The system was quickly adopted by several commercial gun makers, and the United States government decided to test it.

In 1845 the Maynard system was installed on 300 converted percussion muskets and trials were considered successful. In 1855 the Maynard Tape Primer System was installed on all 1855 model .58 caliber military rifles and carbines made at Federal arsenals.

 However the system was complicated and often malfunctioned in wartime conditions. During the Crimean War British cavalrymen had been equipped with 2,000 Greene carbines, a Maynard system firearm, and the system was found to be unreliable in the field. In 1860 U.S. ordnance officers recommended dropping the Maynard Tape Primer System, and the famous 1861 Springfield rifled muskets did not use it.

In 1851, however, Maynard had patented a more successful idea: a simple lever-operated breechloading rifle, which used a metallic cartridge his own invention. When the gun's lever was depressed the barrel rose, opening the breech for loading. Afterwards the lever was raised to close the gun's breech. Once cocked the loaded weapon could be primed by either placing a percussion cap directly on its nipple or by using Maynard's priming system to advance a primer to the nipple.  The brass Maynard cartridge did not have an integral percussion cap; a small hole in the middle of its base fired it when the external cap was detonated. The cartridge, which had a wide rim permitting swift extraction, was reloadable up to 100 times.  This was of particular advantage to the Confederacy, as the cartridges could be manufactured without the sophisticated equipment that the south generally lacked. Another significant feature was that the use of a metallic cartridge prevented gas escape at the breech, a serious concern for early externally primed breechloaders.

Production
The Springfield Armory manufactured a sample Maynard carbine in .48 caliber and it was tested in May 1856. The gun, fired at ranges from 100 to 500 yards, was considered the best breechloader tested. Subsequently, the cartridge's powder charge was raised from 30 to 40 grains, loaded behind a 343-grain lubricated bullet.

Maynard and his financial backers founded the Maynard Arms Company in 1857, contracting the Massachusetts Arms Company to manufacture the new gun for civilian and military use. The guns, known as Maynards, were offered in .35 and .50 caliber, and could be purchased with interchangeable smoothbore shotgun barrels. A second army test resulted in a military  contract for four hundred .50 caliber Maynard carbines, with the original long-range aperture tang sight replaced with a barrel mounted open sight. The Revenue Cutter Service (later the United States Coast Guard) and United States Navy ordered smaller numbers.

The Maynard was highly praised in frontier service, but only four U.S. regiments appear to have been armed with the first model Maynard during the American Civil War. Between 1861 and 1863 only the 1st (later 4th) U.S., 9th Pennsylvania, and 1st Wisconsin Cavalry received the gun. This may have been because  the Massachusetts Arms Company's factory burned down in January 1861. Rebuilt by 1863 the factory began producing 20,000 of the simpler Second Model Maynard carbines for the U.S. government but deliveries did not begin until June 1864, continuing through May 1865. As a result, few of the second model Maynards saw service, although some reached the 9th and 11th Indiana regiments and the 11th Tennessee Cavalry.

Some Southern states had purchased Maynards for their state militias in late 1860 and early 1861. About 3000 Maynards were in Southern hands during the war, mostly in Florida, Georgia, and Mississippi units. The First Model Maynard was listed as an official firearm in Confederate ordnance manuals. The Maynard had a good reputation for long range accuracy and Confederate sharpshooters made extensive use of it, especially during the Siege of Charleston. Maynard cartridges were easily manufactured in the Confederacy, in contrast to the complex internally primed rimfire cartridges of captured Spencer and Henry rifles. The Maynard was easily adaptable to these newer cartridges and it was one of the few patent breechloaders to survive the Civil War. It continued in production as a highly regarded centerfire target and hunting rifle until 1890.

See also
Rifle
Shotgun

References

External links
 Edward MAYNARD tape-primer system US Patent no. 4,208 - 1845
 

Firearm designers
Defunct firearms manufacturers
American dentists
19th-century American inventors
1813 births
1891 deaths
American Civil War industrialists
People of Washington, D.C., in the American Civil War
American dentistry academics
People from Madison, New York
19th-century dentists